The Oaxacan yellow tree frog (Megastomatohyla pellita)  is a species of frog in the family Hylidae and is endemic to Mexico. Its natural habitats are subtropical or tropical moist montane forests and rivers. It is threatened by habitat loss.

References

Megastomatohyla
Amphibians described in 1968
Taxonomy articles created by Polbot